Chachaura is a city in Madhya Pradesh, India, situated on the border with Rajasthan. The primary language spoken in the city is Hindi. Chachaura is classified as a nagar panchayat, a settlement transitioning from rural to urban. Chachaura is also a proposed district of Madhya Pradesh, which was approved by cabinet on 18 March 2020. The city is divided into 15 wards for which elections are held every 5 years.

Demographics Chachaura 
As of the 2001 Census of India, 17,303 people lived in Chachaura.

As of the 2011 Census of India, 21,860 people live in Chachaura, out of which 11,502 are males and 10,358 are females. Now in 2022-2023 estimated population of Chachaura are 28,000 approximate. 

Major castes found in this region are Meena, Gujjar, Bhil, and Lodha. The region has been dominated by Meenas, who are said to have migrated from the adjacent state of Rajasthan during the 18th century.

Transport 
Gwalior Airport is the nearest airport to Chachaura.

References

Internal borders of India
Cities and towns in Guna district